Skol Airlines was a Russian charter operator providing regular passenger flights and cargo charters across Eastern and Western Siberia; its clients included Alrosa and Gazprom amongst others. The company also had its own 23 hectare heliport, the 100-room hostel on-site, dining room, Mi-8 hangar, helicopter filling station and a certified aircraft maintenance base. The company was notable for its successful efforts to curtail the 2007 Greek forest fires.

In mid-2021, Russia's Federal Air Transport Agency banned it from operating 30 helicopters and five light-engine L-410s due to debts to GTLK.

As of December 2021, the airline was banned from operating within the European Union.

The airlines' operator certificate was revoked after it went bankrupt in 2022.

Fleet as of 2012

Accidents & Incidents
 On 21 October 2016, Skol Airlines Flight 9375, a Mi-8 helicopter with 19 passengers and a crew of 3 impacted terrain in poor weather conditions, with 19 fatalities.

References

External links
Official website (Russian)

Airlines of Russia
Companies based in Khanty-Mansi Autonomous Okrug

Defunct airlines of Russia
2022 disestablishments
2000 establishments